Lactarius subumbonatus is a member of the large milk-cap genus Lactarius in the order Russulales. It was first described scientifically by Sven Johan Lindgren in 1845.

See also
List of Lactarius species

References

External links

subumbonatus
Fungi described in 1845
Fungi of Europe